Foreign relations date back to 1807, when the Russian warship Neva arrived in Sydney as part of its circumnavigation of the globe.  Consular relations between Australia and the Russian Empire were established in 1857. Diplomatic relations between Australia and the Soviet Union were established in 1942, and the first Australian embassy opened in 1943.

Relations between the two countries severely deteriorated in 2014 due to Russia's invasion of Crimea and the downing of Malaysia Airlines Flight 17, which claimed the lives of 38 Australians. Relations further deteriorated in 2022 as a result of Russia's full-scale invasion of Ukraine. According to a 2017 Pew Global Attitudes Project survey, 37% of Australians have a favourable view of Russia, with 55% expressing an unfavourable view.

Pre-Russian Federation relations

Russian Empire

1803–1898 
Peter the Great was familiar with New Holland through his connections with the Dutch, and the Empire in the 18th century tried several times, unsuccessfully, to reach the Australian continent.

Contacts between Russia and Australia date back to 1803, when Secretary of State for the Colonies Lord Hobart wrote to Governor of New South Wales Philip Gidley King in relation to the first Russian circumnavigation of the globe by Adam Johann von Krusenstern and Yuri Lisyansky. Hagemeister and the ship's officers were extended the utmost courtesy by Governor William Bligh, with the Governor inviting the Russians to Government House for dinner and a ball.

Bellingshausen returned to Sydney after discovering Antarctica, spending the winter at the invitation of Governor Lachlan Macquarie. Macquarie played the greatest role in the expression of Russophilia in the Colony, ensuring that the Russian visitors were made to feel welcome.

While in Sydney, Bellingshausen collected information on the colony, which he published in Russia as Short Notes on the Colony of New South Wales. He wrote that Schmidt, a naturalist who was attached to the Lazarev expedition, discovered gold near Hartley, making him the first person to discover gold in Australia. While in Sydney, on 27 March 1820, officials from the colony were invited on board Vostok to celebrate Orthodox Easter, marking the first time that a Russian Orthodox service was held in the Australian Colonies.

Although Russia and Britain were allies against Napoleon, the capture of Paris in 1814 by the Imperial Russian Army caused consternation with the British in relation to Tsar Alexander's intention of expanding Russian influence which would compete with Britain's own imperial ambitions. Visits by Russian ships became so common in Sydney Cove that their place of mooring near Neutral Bay became known as Russian Point, which added to the sense of alarm in the Colonies.

By the late 1830s, relations between Russia and Britain had deteriorated, and in 1841 the Government of New South Wales decided to establish fortification at Pinchgut in order to repel a feared Russian invasion. Fortifications at Queenscliff, Portsea, and Mud Islands in Melbourne's Port Philip Bay followed, as did similar structures on the Tamar River near Launceston and on the banks of the Derwent River at Sandy Bay and Hobart.

As Australia was engaged in a gold rush in the 1840s and 1850s, in conjunction with the Crimean War between the UK and Russia, paranoia of a Russian invasion gripped the Colony, and Russophobia increased. In 1855, the Colony built fortifications around Admiralty House and completed Fort Denison on Pinchgut Island, as the emergence of the Pacific Ocean Fleet of the Imperial Russian Navy furthered the fear of a Russian invasion of the Colonies, and rumours spread that the Russians had invaded the Port of Melbourne. Inflows of Russians and Russian-speaking immigrants which began to increase in the 1850s, and the nature of friendly relations between Russian and Australian representatives, led to the appointment of two Russian honorary consuls in 1857; James Damyon in Melbourne and EM Paul in Sydney.

Seven years after the conclusion of the Crimean War, the Russian corvette, and flagship of the Russian Pacific squadron,  visited Melbourne and Sydney in 1863. The corvette visited the cities on a navigational drill under the Commander of the Russian Pacific Fleet Rear Admiral Andrey Alexandrovich Popov, and the ship and crew were welcomed with warmth. Popov paid Governor of Victoria Henry Barkly and Governor of New South Wales John Young protocol visits, and they in turn visited the Russian ship. The Russians opened the ship for public visitation in Melbourne, and more than 8,000 Australians visited the ship over a period of several days. The goodwill visit was a success, but Bogatyrs appearance in Melbourne did put the city on a war footing, as noted in The Argus which reported that the ship managed to approach Melbourne unnoticed, ostensibly due to the lack of naval forces in Port Phillip Bay. After Bogatyr had left the Colony, the Sydney Morning Herald reported on 7 April 1863 that the crew of the ship had engaged in topographical surveys of the Port Jackson and Botany Bay areas, which included investigating coastal fortifications, but this did not raise any eyebrows at the time.

Anti-Russian sentiment in Australia began to take hold in the Australian media in November 1864 after the publication by The Times in London of an article which asserted that the Colonies were on the edge of a Russian invasion. The article, published on 17 September 1864, stated that Rear Admiral Popov received instructions from the Russian Naval Minister to raid Melbourne in the event there was a Russo-English war, but noted that such a plan was unlikely due to its perception of the Russian forces being inadequate for such an attack. Australian newspapers, including The Age and Argus, took The Times claims more seriously and began to write on the need to increase defence capabilities to protect against the threat of a Russian invasion. On 11 May 1870, the corvette  appeared at the Derwent River and rumours spread in Hobart that a Russian invasion was almost a certainty. The reason for the appearance of the Russian warship was humanitarian in nature; the ship's purser was ill and Captain Serkov gained permission to hospitalise Grigory Belavin and remain in port for two weeks to replenish supplies and give the crew opportunity for some shore leave. The ship's officers were guests at the Governor's Ball held in honour of the birthday of Queen Victoria, and The Mercury noted that the officers were gallant and spoke three languages including English and French. The following day a parade was held, and the crew of Boyarin raised the Union Jack on its mast and fired a 21-gun salute in honour to the British queen. This was reciprocated by the town garrison which raised the Russian Naval flag of Saint Andrew and fired a salute in honour of Tsar Alexander II. After the death of Belavin, permission was given to bury him on shore, and his funeral saw the attendance of thousands of Hobart residents, and the locals donated funds to provide for a headstone on his grave. In gratitude of the welcome and care given by the Hobart citizenry, Captain Serkov presented the city with two mortars from the ship, which still stand at the entrance to the Anglesea Barracks. When Boyarin left Hobart on 12 June, a military band onshore played God Save the Tsar, and the ship's crew replied by playing God Save the Queen.

Although the visits of Russian ships were of a friendly nature, the Russo-Turkish War of 1877–1878 was seen by Britain as part of a potential expansion plan by the Russian Empire into India, and the Australian colonies were advised to upgrade their defence capabilities. The inadequacy of defences in the colony was seen in 1862, when Svetlana sailed into Port Phillip Bay and the fort built had no gunpowder for its cannons to use to return a salute. William Jervois, a Royal Engineer, was commissioned to determine the defence capabilities of all colonies, with the exception of Western Australia. In his report, he was convinced that the Russian Empire would to attack South Australian shipping in an attempt to destroy the local economy. As a result of Jervois' report, Fort Glanville and Fort Largs were built to protect Port Adelaide.

The Melbourne-based Epoch re-ignited fears of a Russia invasion when three Russian ships—, and —were sighted near Port Phillip in January 1882. Despite the hysteria generated by the media in Melbourne, no invasion ensued. David Syme, the proprietor of The Age, wrote in a series of editorials that the visit of the three ships was associated with a war that was threatening to engulf Britain and Russia, and that the squadron under the command of Avraamy Aslanbegov was in the Pacific in order to raid British commerce. Newspapers wrote that Admiral Aslanbegov behaved like a varnished barbarian due to his non-acceptance of invitations, and because he preferred to stay at the Menzies Hotel, rather than the Melbourne Club or the Australian Club. Aslanbegov was accused of spying and fraud, leading to the Admiral complaining to the Premier of Victoria Bryan O'Loghlen and threatening legal action against the newspaper. John Wodehouse, 1st Earl of Kimberley, the British Secretary of State for the Colonies, defused the situation when he sent a telegraph to the government stating that relations with Russia are of a friendly character, and such newspaper reports are rendered incredible. Due to the fears of an invasion, Fort Scratchley in Newcastle was completed by 1885.

Nicholai Miklukho-Maklai after conducting ethnographic research in New Guinea since 1871 moved to the Australian Colonies in 1878, where he worked on William John Macleay's zoological collection in Sydney and set up Australia's first marine biological station in 1881. Since 1883 he advocated setting up a Russian protectorate on the Maclay Coast in New Guinea, and noted his ideas of Russian expansionism in letters to those in power in Saint Petersburg. In a letter he wrote to N. V. Kopylov in 1883, he noted there was a mood of expansionism in Australia, particularly towards New Guinea and the islands in Oceania. He also wrote to Tsar Alexander III in December 1883 that due to the lack of a Russian sphere of influence in the South Pacific and English domination in the region, there was a threat to Russian supremacy in the North Pacific. This view was mirrored in a letter to Konstantin Pobedonostsev, and he expressed his willingness to provide assistance in pursuing Russian interests in the region. Nicholas de Giers, the Russian Foreign Minister, suggested in reports to the Tsar that relations with Miklukho-Maklai should be maintained because of his familiarity with political and military issues in the region, while not advising him of any plans on the Government's plans for the region. This opinion was mirrored by the Naval Ministry. In total, three reports were sent to Russia by Miklukho-Maklai, containing information on the growth of anti-Russian sentiment and the buildup of the military in Australia, which correlated with the worsening of Anglo-Russian relations. Noting the establishment of coal bunkers and the fortifying of ports in Sydney, Melbourne, and Adelaide, he advocated taking over Port Darwin, Thursday Island, Newcastle, and Albany, noting their insufficient fortification. The Foreign Ministry considered a Russian colony in the Pacific as unlikely and military notes of the reports were only partially utilised by the Naval Ministry. The authorities in Russia appraised his reports, and in December 1886 de Giers officially advised Miklukho-Maklai that his request for the establishment of a Russian colony had been declined.

1888–1917 

Paranoia of a Russian invasion subsided in 1888, when Grand Duke Alexander Mikhailovich arrived in the Colony on board the corvette  as part of celebrations of the Colonial centenary. Rynda pulled into Newcastle in the afternoon of 19 January 1888 to replenish coal supplies, becoming the first Russian naval visitor to the city. The Newcastle Morning Herald and Miners' Advocate reported on 20 January 1888 that given the uncertain state of diplomatic relations between the European powers many people fled fearing that the Russian warship was present in Newcastle to start a war; however, those fears were quickly allayed when the goodwill nature of the visit became known. From Newcastle, Rynda sailed to Sydney. The day after arrival Lord Carrington, the Governor of New South Wales, sent a coach to bring the Grand Duke to Government House. He was unable to attend due to laws of the Russian Empire which prohibited participation in State ceremonies of foreign states. The Russian officers attended Government House on 24 January as the guest of Lady Carrington.  was late arriving in Sydney and on 26 January, the day of celebrations, the Rynda orchestra was invited to entertain the public, and the Australian media made the Grand Duke the central focus of the events. On 30 January the Russian officers were present at the ceremony of the foundation of the new parliament building. One hundred seamen from Rynda were invited to a festival organised by the citizens of Sydney on 31 January, and the Russian and French flags were given prominence next to the Australian flag, whilst those of other nations were along the walls. Denoting the goodwill nature of the visit, Lord Carrington in a speech said, "We welcome into the waters of Port Jackson the gallant ship Rynda, we welcome the gallant sailors who sail under the blue cross of Saint Andrew, and we especially welcome — though we are not permitted to do so in official manner – that distinguished officer who is on board, a close blood-relation of his Majesty the Tsar. Though not permitted to offer him an official welcome, we offer him a right royal welcome with all our hearts." Rynda left Sydney on 9 February and arrived in Melbourne on 12 February. The visit was initially reported positively in the press, but after a few days The Age began to campaign for restricting the entry of foreign naval ships into Melbourne, and other articles described the expected war between "semi-barbarous and despotic Russia" and England. The public, however, continued to view the presence of the Russians positively, and on 22 February the Mayor of Melbourne Benjamin Benjamin visited the ships. After staying for nearly a month, Rynda left Melbourne on 6 March for New Zealand. The Grand Duke supported expanding trade ties with Australia, noting that it was desirable for the Russians to expand their ties with Australia, outside of their relationship with Britain, and stated his belief that such relations were long overdue.

In 1890, the Government in Saint Petersburg concluded Anglo-Russian relations in the Pacific to have become important enough to appoint a career diplomat to represent Russian interests in the Australian Colonies. When John Jamison, the Russian honorary consul in Melbourne, went bankrupt and was no longer able to represent Russia's interests, the Russian government appointed Alexey Poutyata as the first Imperial Russian Consul to the Colonies on 14 July 1893, and he arrived with his family in Melbourne on 13 December 1893. Poutyata was an effective Consul and his reports were well read in Saint Petersburg. His efforts at encouraging Australian manufacturers and merchants to attend the All-Russia Exhibition 1896 in Nizhny Novgorod were instrumental in the signing of commercial contracts between Tasmanian merchants and manufacturers in Russia. Poutyata died of kidney failure following complications from pneumonia a little over a year after his arrival in Australia on 16 December 1894, which saw Robert Ungern von Sternberg being appointed to replace him at the end of 1895. Nikolai Matyunin, who replaced Sternberg as Consul in 1898, signed an agreement with Dalgety Australia Ltd, which enabled Russian cargo ships to carry the company's pastoral products back to Europe.

On , the Russian Minister of Foreign Affairs Vladimir Lambsdorff wrote to the Naval Minister, advising him that sending a ship was not a political act but one of diplomatic etiquette. Tsar Nicholas II viewed that "[i]t is desirable to send a cruiser". Gromoboi arrived in Melbourne, after a call in Albany in the Great Southern region of Western Australia, on 30 April 1901. The Russian Empire was represented at the opening of the first Australian Parliament on 1 May 1901 by Russian consul Nicolai Passek, who was based in Melbourne since the approval of his appointment by Queen Victoria on 24 March 1900. The Duke of York visited Gromoboi and was impressed by the cruiser, and he sent a request to Tsar Nicholas II asking that Jessen and Gromoboi be allowed to accompany him to Sydney as an honour escort; a request which was approved.

British financial and political support for the Japanese during the Russo-Japanese War in 1904–1905 caused disagreement with the British foreign policy in Australia. The authorities in Australia were concerned that the Japanese military posed a threat to the national security of the country, and the fear existed even when Japan was an ally of the Entente Powers in World War I. During the war, as a member of the British Empire, Australia was allied with Russia.

Soviet Union

Russian Federation relations

Diplomatic ties 

On 26 December 1991, Australia recognised the Russian Federation as the successor state of the Soviet Union after the dissolution of the latter. Russia has an embassy in Canberra and a consulate-general in Sydney, and Australia has an embassy in Moscow. The current Ambassador of Russia to Australia is Aleksey Pavlovsky, while the current Ambassador of Australia to Russia is Peter Tesch.

Political ties 
The Russian government accepted an offer of Rosaviakosmos on 10 March 2001 to co-operate with the Asia-Pacific Space Centre in developing a spaceport on Christmas Island, an Australian territory in the Indian Ocean. The project also saw the involvement of S.P. Korolev Rocket and Space Corporation Energia, TsSKB-Progress and the Barmin General Mechanical Engineering Design Bureau.

In aid of the project, the Agreement between the Government of Australia and the Government of the Russian Federation on Cooperation in the Field of the Exploration and Use of Outer Space for Peaceful Purposes was signed in Canberra on 23 May 2001, replacing the Agreement between the Government of the Union of the Soviet Socialist Republics and the Government of Australia on Cooperation in the Field of Exploration and the Use of Outer Space for Peaceful Purposes of 1 December 1987, and import tax and other concessions were made by the Australian government.

Co-operation in space was on the agenda when Alexander Downer met in Moscow with Russian Foreign Minister Igor Ivanov in February 2002, where the Australian side pressed the Russians to complete work on two technical agreements which were needed in order for the Christmas Island spaceport project to proceed. In June 2002 it was reported that the Russian Federal Space Agency had pulled out of the deal, to instead develop a relationship with ArianeSpace with the view to using the Guiana Space Centre near Kourou in French Guiana.

In September 2007 President Vladimir Putin became the first incumbent Russian leader to visit Australia for the APEC summit in Sydney. On 7 September 2007, head of Rosatom Sergey Kiriyenko and Australian Minister of Foreign Affairs Alexander Downer, in the presence of Prime Minister John Howard and President Putin, signed the Agreement between the Government of Australia and the Government of the Russian Federation on Cooperation in the Use of Nuclear Energy for Peaceful Purposes, superseding the Agreement between the Government of Australia and the Government of the Union of the Soviet Socialist Republics concerning the peaceful uses of nuclear energy which was concluded on 15 February 1990. The 1990 Agreement only allowed Russia to enrich uranium on behalf of third countries and the 2007 Agreement allowed for enriching of uranium for use in Russia's civilian nuclear power industry.

Putin dismissed suggestions that Russia would use Australia-supplied uranium for nuclear weapons or military purposes, and explained that Russia has an "excessive supply" of weapons-grade uranium and the state has plans to build 30 nuclear power stations by 2022, and that the agreement with Australia was purely one of economics.

The agreement was put into doubt after the August 2008 war in South Ossetia and Russia's subsequent recognition of Abkhazia and South Ossetia as independent states. Stephen Smith, the Australian Foreign Minister, told Sky News Australia in November 2008 that ratification of the agreement would see Australia reviewing Russia's involvement in Georgia, Abkhazia and South Ossetia, and also by taking into account the state of bilateral relations between the two countries.

After Russia recognised Abkhazia and South Ossetia on 26 August 2008, Stephen Smith summoned the Russian ambassador, Alexander Blokhin, to inform him that Russia's recognition was not helpful for the situation in the region, while Blokhin informed the Australian Foreign Minister that Russia was left with no choice but to recognise the independence of the two regions.

Blaming Georgian President Mikheil Saakashvili for the conflict, Blokhin told The Age that the Russians were not the aggressors, but rather the peacekeepers. Rory Medcalf, a strategic analyst with the Lowy Institute, stated that Australia could use the uranium deal to apply pressure on Moscow, but in doing so it risked sending messages to countries such as China that it is an unreliable supplier, which would in turn hurt Australian interests.

Economic ties 

Australia and Russia are both members of the Asia-Pacific Economic Cooperation forum. Simon Crean, the Australian Minister for Trade stated in October 2008 that Australia supports Russia's application to join the World Trade Organization. Russia applied for entry into the organisation in 1993, and says that the United States and European Union have placed unreasonable demands for it to accede to the organisation, although the United States and the European Union blame Russia for delays in its entry.

Investment 
In September 2007, at the Russia–Australia Business Forum in Brisbane, Ian Macfarlane, the Australian Minister for Industry, Tourism and Resources, estimated that Russian investment in Australia was worth between A$5 and 6 billion. The acquisition by RusAl of a 20% stake in Queensland Alumina was approved by the Australian Foreign Investment Review Board in February 2005. RusAl purchased the stake from Kaiser Aluminum in October 2004, in a deal which was valued at US$461 million. The investment by RusAl was the first large-scale Russian investment in the Australian economy.

Magnitogorsk Iron and Steel Works, headed by Viktor Rashnikov, increased its stake in iron ore miner Fortescue Metals Group from 4.71 percent to 5.37 in August 2007, and the following month advised the Australian Government it wished to increase its stake, with a potential value of A$1.5 billion. It is expected by the 2050, the 2.7 billion people of the BRIC countries—Brazil, Russia, India and People's Republic of China—will treble consumption of steel, which will require steel production to double from 2007 limits.

Alan Carpenter, the Premier of Western Australia, welcomed Russian investment in his state's economy, telling Lateline Business, "[t]he more we can get from international investment to deliberate the potential of Western Australia's economy, the better". In April 2008, Carpenter became the first Western Australian Premier to visit Russia, when he headed a trade delegation for a five-day trip to the country to court more Russian investment in the state.

Trade statistics 

In 2008, Australian-Russian bilateral trade exceeded US$1 billion for the first time. Russia imported US$1.029 billion worth of goods and services from Australia in 2008, while its exports to Australia were valued at US$82 million, bringing the total to US$1.111 billion. According to the Russian Federal Customs Service, trade with Australia accounted for 0.2% of all Russian foreign trade in 2008.

2022 Russian invasion of Ukraine 
Following Russia's invasion of Ukraine in February 2022, Australia announced that it would send military equipment and medical supplies to Ukraine, with the Prime Minister arguing that Russia should be treated as a pariah state. Australia committed $70 million to provide both lethal and nonlethal aid to Ukraine, including missiles and ammunition.

Australia also imposed sanctions on Russia, targeting members of Russia's national security council with travel bans and financial sanctions, and extending existing sanctions to the separatist regions of the Donetsk People's Republic and Luhansk People's Republic. Further sanctions were imposed on president Vladimir Putin, foreign minister Sergey Lavrov, 339 members of the Russian parliament and eight oligarch close to Putin. A third round of sanctions targeted senior military officers involved in the invasion; senior Russian government officials such as Dmitry Peskov, Putin's press secretary and Maria Zakharova, spokesperson for the Russian Ministry of Foreign Affairs; and the Russian Armed Forces.

On 7 March, the Russian government included Australia on an adopted list of countries it deemed as "taking unfriendly actions against Russia, Russian companies, and citizens", in reference to economic sanctions introduced during the Russia-Ukraine war.

On 18 March, a fourth round of sanctions were imposed on oligarchs Oleg Deripaska and Viktor Vekselberg, as well as 20 Russian businesses. On March 20, Australia banned the export of alumina and bauxite to Russia. On 31 March, Australia announced a 35 per cent tariff on all imports from Russia and Belarus. On 7 April, a fifth round of sanctions targeted 67 Russian government officials and oligarchs.

On 8 April, Russia banned 228 Australian political figures including Prime Minister Scott Morrison, Leader of the Opposition Anthony Albanese and all members of the Australian Parliament. The Russian Foreign Ministry stated that the blacklist was in retaliation to Australia's "unfriendly actions" aimed at containing Russia, which it described as "Russophobic" and "docilely" following other Western countries. Moscow also warned that it would expand the blacklist to include Australian military officials, businesspeople, experts and journalists who allegedly "incited a negative attitude towards Russia."

See also 

 Foreign relations of Australia
 Foreign relations of Russia
List of ambassadors of Australia to Russia
List of ambassadors of Russia to Australia
Russian Australians

References

Bibliography

External links 

 Publications of Dr Elena Govor on Australia-Russia relations
 Australian Department of Foreign Affairs and Trade about the relation with Russia
  Documents on the Australia-Russia relationship from the Russian Ministry of Foreign Affairs

 
Bilateral relations of Russia
Russia